Caerwys F.C. (Welsh Clwb Pêl Droed Caerwys) is a football club representing the Flintshire town of Caerwys in Wales, and they play their home games at Lon yr Ysgol at Caerwys.

Caerwys currently play in the North East Wales Football League after the reorganisation of the Clwyd League in the 2011–12 season.

History

Located in Flintshire on the border with Denbighshire, Caerwys F.C. was formed at the turn of the century when they were known as Caerwys Town. Unfortunately there are no records of that team apart from a team photo from 1921. It is believed they just played friendly matches until a team apparently joined the Halkyn Mountain League post-war.

In more recent times a team was entered into the Llandyrnog & District Summer League in the late 60s which was originally organised in the 50s for the farming community. Success was achieved in 1971 and 1972 when Caerwys won the League Championship and they boasted a very strong side. They also won the Times Shield, a knockout competition on three occasions in 1970, 1989 & 1990. Large crowds of up to 600 people turned out for those finals, something which is rarely seen at Caerwys these days.

In 1983 a team was entered into Division 3 of the Clwyd League. In those days, there were the likes of Wrexham and Chester Reserves in the Clwyd Premier Division. After a steady rise through the divisions, the team had progressed through to the Clwyd Premier Division under the guidance of Manager Jack Phillips (who had also run the club's youth team for ten seasons), finishing runners up in 1999–2000 in the Premier Division. Caerwys gained promotion to the Welsh Alliance League, where they remained for eight seasons. The team enjoyed mediocre success but resigned in 2008 to concentrate on putting their financial resources into building a new pavilion, plus the added financial strain of running a team in the W.A.L. For five years the club was sponsored by Les Ward and his container business, Securistore.

In 1998 the club's veterans over 40s team managed by Steve Griffith and Dave Williams had triumphed in the National UMBRO knockout cup by defeating Bedfordshire based Sandy Albion at Rushden & Diamonds ground. During that spell the club ran five teams at senior level.
The first team had its best spell since promoted to the W.A.L., in 2003–04 when they reached three major cup semi-finals including the Welsh Trophy and the North Wales Challenge Cup under the guidance of Russ Pierce and Mark Speakman and finished mid-table in the League.
In 2006–07 season the first team was taken over by Richie Roberts who was assisted by Mark Speakman. The team finished with their best points tally in 10th spot since joining the Welsh Alliance League, but Roberts, a local farmer, had to put his job first and called it a day. The Reserves were managed by long serving player Matty Peters, who took over when the team dropped down to the Clwyd Premier.

The Veterans team joined the Cheshire Vets League in 2005/06. In their first season they clinched the Division 1 title gaining promotion to the Premier Division. The Vets went on to lift the League Cup and also the Premier Division Title. In 2009–10 the team changed their name coming under the umbrella of Flint Town United as all their matches are played there due to there being no Sunday facilities at Caerwys.

In 2016 the Veterans team was resurrected and reached the final of the North East Wales Cup losing to British Steel at Rhydymwyn.
Dyfan Davies was appointed in 2017 as Manager of the Llandyrnog & District Summer League team which is totally reliant on players residing within the parish due to strict rules which forbid using outside players. Caerwys have been members since 1968.

In 2009 local builder and committee member Shaun Davies began work on the new pavilion. A£30,000 grant was obtained from Flintshire County Council plus £2500 from Caerwys Town Council with the club providing £18,000 from fundraising. This was enough to complete phase one. An additional grant of £26,000 from Cadwyn Clwyd, which the club had to match fund with 30%, saw the completion of phase 2 by 2012.
The club's kit used to be sponsored by Shotblast Engineering Services based at Greenfield, whose owner, Roger Burgess, died on 20 September 2011. The company sponsored the club on and off for 25 years. Since then the club has been sponsored by the Royal Oak, Holywell based ICRGroup for two seasons then local based Thomas Plant Hire since 2015.

Caerwys were promoted from the Clwyd League East at the end of the 2013/14 season into the Welsh National League Division 1. After three seasons in the WNL, the team resigned before the season ended, citing lack of commitment from players combined by a poorly run league, which had seen eight matches called off because of a lack of match officials. The following season 2016–17, Caerwys entered the North East Wales league with local player Nick Voyle appointed as Manager. The team finished tenth, having beaten most of the better sides in the league. 2018–19 started well with the team progressing in two cups but in December 2018, Voyle resigned as Team Manager, citing lack of commitment from players.  Shaun Davies took over as Interim Manager and the team finished the season on a winning run with only one defeat in six matches and that was only due to having no recognised keeper.  The team finished in a creditable fifth spot. The club were going to apply to the Vale of Clwyd league for season 2019-20 but have now decided to stay where they are under the guidance of Ethan Jones and Jordan Hadaway who will take charge next season.  Caerwys Veterans also finished mid-table in the newly formed North East Wales Vets League which was won by Rhyl.

Current squad

References

External links
Official site
Official FAW page

Sport in Flintshire
Football clubs in Wales
Association football clubs established in 2005
Caerwys
Welsh Alliance League clubs